is a passenger railway station located in the city of Tokushima, Tokushima Prefecture, Japan. It is operated by JR Shikoku and has the station number "M04".

Lines
Only local trains stop at the station.

Layout
The station consists of a side platform serving a single track. The station building is unstaffed and serves only as a waiting room. The present track was once track 2 of two tracks being served by an island platform. The trackbed of the now removed track 1 runs on the other side of the platform. A paved path from the station building crosses this old trackbed to a ramp which gives access to the platform.

Adjacent stations

History
After the company was nationalized in 1 September 1917, Japanese Government Railways (JGR) took over control of the station and operated it as part of the Komatsushima Light Railway and later, the Komatsushima Line. With the privatization of Japanese National Railways (JNR), the successor of JGR, on 1 April 1987, JR Shikoku took over control of the station.

Passenger statistics
In fiscal 2017, the station was used by an average of 305 passengers daily

Surrounding area
Tokushima City Hall Katsura Branch
Hakuai Memorial Hospital

See also
List of railway stations in Japan

References

External links

 JR Shikoku timetable

Railway stations in Tokushima Prefecture
Railway stations in Japan opened in 1913
Tokushima (city)